Tom Doshi (born 6 June 1966) is an Albanian businessman and politician, ex-member of the Socialist Party of Albania in the last three legislatures (2005, 2009, 2013), and the leader of the Social Democratic Party of Albania.

Biography
A scion of a famous family from Kelmendi, Doshi spent his childhood in the village of Velipojë, 31 km in northwest of Shkodër. He graduated in Law from the State University of Tetova. For some time Doshi lived in Australia where his four children were born.

After returning to Albania, Doshi conducted a series of manoeuvres in the business field acquiring various businesses, such as a milk processing plant and the biggest pharmaceutical company in the country.

Politics
Doshi entered politics with the Socialist Party of Albania under the leadership of Fatos Nano in the legislature that began in 2005, and continued to stay in the Socialist Party even after the arrival of the new leader Edi Rama. During his years as a deputy, from 2005 to 2007, Doshi has served as a member of the Committee of Labour, Social Affairs and Health.
Doshi is the chairman of the Social Democratic Party of Albania.

Controversies

Assault on journalist 
In March 2008 Tom Doshi was accused of assaulting the Balkan Investigative Reporting Network (BIRN) journalist Besar Likmeta in front of another MP. Likmeta was investigating the origin of Doshi's diploma.

Alleged murder plot 
On March 2, 2015 Tom Doshi was expelled from the Socialist Party's parliamentary group. The expulsion came after Doshi had filed harsh criticisms against Prime Minister Edi Rama, Defence Minister Saimir Tahiri and the Speaker of the Parliament Ilir Meta. Doshi commented: "Today Rama has a tutor called Ilir Meta, who has paid lek [money] and ordered to kill me and Mhill Fufi."

Days later, Doshi released the video of a private conversation between him and Durim Bani, the assassin paid to eliminate Doshi. In the video Bani states that "there are over 200,000 euros for the head of Doshi" and that "the killers will have the support of the government and Ilir Meta."

Sanctions 
On 16 April 2018, Doshi and his family members were banned from entering the United States of America.

References

20th-century Albanian businesspeople
21st-century Albanian businesspeople
Socialist Party of Albania politicians
People from Shkodër
Political party leaders of Albania
Members of the Parliament of Albania
1966 births
Living people
21st-century Albanian politicians